Venduvazhy is a small village in Ernakulam District. The municipal area is Kothamangalam.  It has a total population of 4300.

Venduvazhy has been divided into two separate areas: Venduvazhy North and Venduvazhy South. Its postal code is 686691.

Public institutions
 Government L.P. School, Venduvazhy
 P. J. Antony Memorial Library

Cities and towns in Ernakulam district